In medicine, referral is the transfer of care for a patient from one clinician or clinic to another by request.

Tertiary care is usually done by referral from primary or secondary medical care personnel.

In the field of sexually transmitted diseases (STDs), referral also means the informing of a partner of a patient diagnosed STD of the potential exposure. Patient referral is where patients directly inform their partners of their exposure to infection. An alternative is provider referral, where trained health department personnel locate partners on the basis of
the names, descriptions, and addresses provided by the patient to inform the partner.

See also

Classification of Pharmaco-Therapeutic Referrals CPR
Family medicine
Family practice
General practice
ICPC-2 PLUS
International Classification of Primary Care ICPC-2
Primary care
Walk-in clinic

References

General practice